Bourdalat is a commune in the Landes department in Nouvelle-Aquitaine in southwestern France.

Geography
The commune of Bourdalat is located at the eastern end of the Landes department, near the Gers, and in the heart of the Bas-Armagnac, the most famous area of the appellation of the same name.

Hydrography
The stream of the Gaube, a tributary of the Midou , waters the lands of the commune. Lake Charros is located in the northeast end of the commune.

Population

See also
Communes of the Landes department

References

Communes of Landes (department)